WWE Over the Limit was a professional wrestling pay-per-view (PPV) event produced by WWE, a professional wrestling promotion based in Connecticut. The event was created in 2010, replacing Judgment Day as the annual May PPV. The name "Over the Limit" was a reference to the hardcore-based match types that occurred as the main event match for each year: an "I Quit" match in 2010 and 2011 and a No Disqualification match in 2012. John Cena competed in the main event match at all three Over the Limit events. In 2013, as Extreme Rules was scheduled for May, Over the Limit was pushed back to October, however, it was canceled and replaced by Battleground.

History
In 2010, World Wrestling Entertainment (WWE) replaced their previously annual May pay-per-view (PPV) Judgment Day with a new PPV titled Over the Limit. The inaugural event was held on May 23, 2010, at the Joe Louis Arena in Detroit, Michigan. Over the Limit would be a short-lived PPV, however, as the 2012 event was the final Over the Limit event held. In 2013, Extreme Rules took the May PPV slot, while Over the Limit was instead scheduled for October, however, it was canceled and replaced by Battleground.  The name "Over the Limit" was a reference to the hardcore-based match types that occurred as the main event match for each year: an "I Quit" match in 2010 and 2011 and a No Disqualification match in 2012.

Over the Limit was introduced during WWE's first brand extension period, in which the promotion divided its roster into brands where wrestlers were exclusively assigned to  perform. As such, the 2010 and 2011 events featured wrestlers from the Raw and SmackDown brands. The first brand extension ended in August 2011. Also in April 2011, WWE ceased using its full name of World Wrestling Entertainment, with the "WWE" abbreviation becoming an orphaned initialism for the promotion.

Events

See also
List of WWE pay-per-view events

References

External links
Official WWE Over the Limit website

 
Recurring events established in 2010
Recurring events disestablished in 2012